The 1940 New Hampshire gubernatorial election was held on November 5, 1940. Republican nominee Robert O. Blood defeated Democratic nominee F. Clyde Keefe with 50.74% of the vote.

Primary elections
Primary elections were held on September 10, 1940.

Republican primary

Candidates
Robert O. Blood, President of the New Hampshire Senate
James C. Farmer

Results

General election

Candidates
Robert O. Blood, Republican
F. Clyde Keefe, Democratic

Results

References

1940
New Hampshire
Gubernatorial